The US Custom House is a historic building in Nogales, Arizona. It was built in 1934 for the United States Customs Service, and designed in the Period Revival style by architect Louis A. Simon. It has been listed on the National Register of Historic Places since August 6, 1987.

References

National Register of Historic Places in Santa Cruz County, Arizona
Government buildings completed in 1934
1934 establishments in Arizona